Carlos Miguel may refer to:

 Carlos Miguel (fencer) (1892–1974), Spanish fencer
 Carlos Miguel (politician) (born 1957), Portuguese lawyer and politician
 Carlos Miguel (footballer, born 1972) (Carlos Miguel da Silva Júnior), Brazilian football midfielder
 Carlos Miguel (footballer, born 1998) (Carlos Miguel dos Santos Pereira), Brazilian football goalkeeper